Evandale is a community in Canada, in the province of New Brunswick. It is situated on the west bank of the Saint John River, and on New Brunswick Route 102.

The Evandale Ferry, a cable ferry, carries Route 124 across the river from Kars on the east bank.

History

After the American Revolution this community was named "Wordens" for New York Loyalist Jarvis Worden, a member of the King's American Regiment in the American Revolution. The community assumed its present name in 1886.

See also
List of communities in New Brunswick

References

Communities in Kings County, New Brunswick